David Andrew Pepper (born June 7, 1971) is an American politician, former chairman of the Ohio Democratic Party, a former councilman for the city of Cincinnati and former member of the Hamilton County, Ohio Board of Commissioners.

Early life
Raised in Cincinnati, Ohio, Pepper is the son of former Procter & Gamble CEO John Pepper. Pepper graduated from Cincinnati Country Day School, earned his B.A. at Yale University, and his J.D. from Yale Law School. He specialized in commercial litigation for the Blank Rome firm.

Career

Political career
In 2001, Pepper was elected to the Cincinnati City Council and served as the Chairman of Council's Law and Public Safety Committee. Pepper was defeated in his run for mayor in 2005.

Pepper was elected to the Hamilton County's Board of Commissioners in November 2006. In 2010, Pepper was a candidate for Ohio Auditor, and in April 2013, Pepper said he would run for state Attorney General in the 2014 election. In 2014, Pepper ran unsuccessfully for Ohio Attorney General. He was elected Chairman of the Ohio Democratic Party in 2015. He has taught voting rights at University of Cincinnati School of Law.

After the 2020 elections, Pepper announced that he would step down as Ohio Democratic Party Chairman at the end of the year.

Writing career
Pepper is the author of The People's House, a political thriller. The book centers around a Russian scheme to help elect Republican candidates. The Wall Street Journal wrote that Pepper "writes with flair and insider knowledge of everything from gerrymandering to arrogant D.C. press aides." and "With speed and savvy, 'The People's House' emerges as a sleeper candidate for political thriller of the year." Bill Clinton said of The Voter File: "Pepper comes through again with this clever tale of how cyber sabotage of elections, coupled with highly concentrated ownership of traditional media operations, can undermine American democracy."

Works

Electoral history

References

External links
Official website

|-

|-

1971 births
Cincinnati City Council members
County commissioners in Ohio
Living people
Ohio Democrats
State political party chairs of Ohio
University of Cincinnati College of Law faculty
Yale Law School alumni